Bradlaugh Hall is a historic hall located in Lahore, Punjab, Pakistan. It was founded in the memory of a British member of the parliament, Charles Bradlaugh.

History
It was founded on 30 October 1900 by Surendra Nath Banerji. After partition of India, it was converted into a technical school, and it was renamed as National Technical Institute.

References

Pakistan Movement
Tourist attractions in Lahore
Indian independence movement
Houses in Pakistan
Buildings and structures in Lahore
1900s establishments in British India